The 2013 Ankara Cup was a professional tennis tournament played on indoor hard courts. It was the third edition of the tournament which was part of the 2013 ITF Women's Circuit, offering a total of $50,000 in prize money. It took place in Ankara, Turkey, on 16–22 December 2013.

Singles entrants

Seeds 

 1 Rankings as of 9 December 2013

Other entrants 
The following players received wildcards into the singles main draw:
  İrem Kaftan
  İnci Öğüt
  İpek Soylu
  Ege Tomey

The following players received entry from the qualifying draw:
  Alix Collombon
  Ekaterine Gorgodze
  Polina Leykina
  Ganna Poznikhirenko

The following player received entry by a protected ranking:
  Vitalia Diatchenko

Champions

Singles 

  Vitalia Diatchenko def.  Marta Sirotkina 6–7(3–7), 6–4, 6–4

Doubles 

  Yuliya Beygelzimer /  Çağla Büyükakçay def.  Eleni Daniilidou /  Aleksandra Krunić 6–3, 6–3

External links 
 2013 Ankara Cup at ITFtennis.com
 

2013 ITF Women's Circuit
2013 in Turkish tennis
2013
December 2013 sports events in Turkey